The 2020–21 Croatian Football Cup was the thirtieth season of Croatia's football knockout competition. The defending champions were Rijeka, having won their sixth title the previous year by defeating Lokomotiva in the final.

Calendar

Participating clubs
The following 48 teams qualified for the competition:

Preliminary round
The draw for the preliminary single-legged round was held on 25 August 2020 and the matches were played on 9 September 2020.

* Matches played on 8 September.

First round
Teams in first round were paired by club coefficient and the matches were played on 7 October 2020.

* Match played on 26 September.
** Match played on 29 September.
*** Match played on 30 September.
**** Matches played on 6 October.
***** Match played on 10 October.
****** Match played on 11 October. Abandoned at halftime because of bad weather. Match continued on 13 October.

Second round
The second round was scheduled for 16 December 2020. The teams were drawn by tie number where winner of tie No. 1 plays against winner of tie No. 16 and so on, with bigger numbers hosting a tie.

* Match played on 14 November.
** Match played on 7 December.
*** Match played on 23 February.
**** Match played on 24 February.
***** Match played on 28 February.
****** Match played on 2 March.

Quarter-finals
The quarter-finals were scheduled for 3 March 2021. 

* Matches played on 16 March.

Semi-finals
The semi-finals were scheduled for 14 April 2021.  Dinamo Zagreb v HNK Gorica has been postponed due to Dinamo's participation in the 2020–21 UEFA Europa League quarter finals.

Final

The final was played on 19 May 2021.

Top scorers

Notes

References

Croatian Football Cup seasons
Croatia
Croatian Cup, 2020-21